General elections were held in Cambodia on 11 September 1966. Only candidates of the Sangkum party were allowed to contest the election, although more than one candidate could run in a constituency. As a result, the party won all 82 seats. The conservative wing of the Sangkum gained a majority. On 18 October the National Assembly of Cambodia nominated Lon Nol as Prime Minister.

Results
Only 28 of the 82 deputies had been previously elected to Parliament, six of whom were members of the conservative wing of the Sangkum.

Government formation
The conservative wing of the Sangkum won a two-thirds majority in parliament, meaning Sihanouk could not prevent the opposition from blocking nominations. As a result, Lon Nol was elected Prime Minister with 59 votes in favour and 23 against.

References

Cambodia
Elections in Cambodia
1966 in Cambodia
One-party elections
Election and referendum articles with incomplete results